Rafael Nadal was the defending champion, but lost in the final to second-seeded Andy Murray, 3–6, 6–2, 6–0.

Seeds

Qualifying

Draw

Finals

Top half

Bottom half

External links
 Main draw

Rakuten Japan Open Tennis Championships - Singles